Ivonino is a rural locality (a village) in Lipetskoye Rural Settlement, Verkhovazhsky District, Vologda Oblast, Russia. The population was 30 as of 2002.

Geography 
Ivonino is located 48 km southwest of Verkhovazhye (the district's administrative centre) by road. Semyonovskaya is the nearest rural locality.

References 

Rural localities in Verkhovazhsky District